José María Zárraga Martín (15 August 1930 – 3 April 2012) was a Spanish professional footballer who played as a midfielder.

Club career
Born in Las Arenas, Biscay, Zárraga signed for Real Madrid in 1949, spending the following two seasons with the reserve team. He made his La Liga debut on 14 October 1951 in a 3–1 home win against Valencia CF, finishing his first two years with the club with 48 games and two goals combined but failing to collect any silverware.

From 1953–60, Zárraga was an important midfield unit as the Merengues won 11 major titles, including five consecutive European Cups (that record would only be bettered by Francisco Gento, who won six) – he played in all the finals, and totaled 31 appearances combined in those victorious campaigns.

Zárraga continued to add to his trophy cabinet in his final two seasons with Real (notably back-to-back national championships), but only played in five matches combined. He retired in June 1962 at nearly 32, having appeared in 306 official games, and went on to have brief coaching spells in the decade, including six matches with CD Málaga in 1968–69 (after replacing Brazilian Otto Bumbel), which ended in top flight relegation; he also worked as a director of football with Valencia and Deportivo Alavés.

International career
Zárraga won eight caps in the Spain national team, his debut coming in 1955 in a 1–1 draw with England at the Chamartín. In his last international appearances, Zárraga played as captain.

Style of play
A midfielder, Zárraga was known for his strength and bravery on the pitch.

Death
Zárraga suffered a stroke in early October 1993, having to be admitted to the Zarzuela Clinic in Madrid. On 3 April 2012, he died at the age of 81, also in the Spanish capital.

Honours
Real Madrid
European Cup: 1955–56, 1956–57, 1957–58, 1958–59, 1959–60
Intercontinental Cup: 1960
Latin Cup: 1955, 1957
La Liga: 1953–54, 1954–55, 1956–57, 1957–58, 1960–61, 1961–62
Copa del Rey: 1961–62

References

External links
 
 
 National team data at BDFutbol
 
 Real Madrid biography
 Biography at Real Madrid Fans 
  Matches in European Cups; at RSSSF

1930 births
2012 deaths
Spanish footballers
Footballers from Getxo
Association football midfielders
La Liga players
Segunda División players
Tercera División players
Arenas Club de Getxo footballers
Real Madrid Castilla footballers
Real Madrid CF players
Spain B international footballers
Spain international footballers
Spanish football managers
La Liga managers
CD Málaga managers
Real Murcia managers
UEFA Champions League winning players